Valdidentro is a comune (municipality) in the Province of Sondrio in the Italian region Lombardy, located about  northeast of Milan and about  northeast of Sondrio, in the upper Alta Valtellina on the border with Switzerland.  
 
It is the seat of hot baths, located on Monte Reit in the frazione of Premadio.
 
Valdidentro borders the following municipalities: Bormio, Grosio, Livigno, Müstair (Switzerland), Poschiavo (Switzerland), Santa Maria Val Müstair (Switzerland), Tschierv (Switzerland), Valdisotto, Zernez (Switzerland).

See also
Lago Viola
Stelvio Pass

References

External links

Cities and towns in Lombardy